The Song of the Flea is a song with piano accompaniment, composed by Modest Mussorgsky in 1879. The lyrics are from the Russian translation of Goethe's Faust.

Background
In 1879, Mussorgsky quit a civil service job, and, from August to November, accompanied contralto Darya Leonova (Дарья Леонова, 1829-1896) on a tour to Southern Russia, as her piano accompanist. He was much impressed by Leonova's singing, and composed The Song of the Flea during this trip or soon after he had returned to St. Petersburg, dedicating it to Leonova. It is unknown when the song was played in a public recital for the first time, but it is recorded that this song was sung in recitals by Leonova in April and May 1880.

The music score of the Song of the Flea was published after Mussorgsky's death, in 1883 with Nikolai Rimsky-Korsakov as the editor.  Its orchestration by Igor Stravinsky became available in 1914.

The Song of the Flea is probably the best known of the 65 or so songs that Mussorgsky composed. It was originally composed for a soprano, but it has been sung by bass singers, such as Feodor Chaliapin. Chaliapin's rendition of the song was inducted into the Grammy Hall of Fame in 1999.

The tenor, Vladimir Rosing, also recorded The Song of the Flea, once for Vocalion in the early 1920s, and again for Parlophone in 1933.

Lyrics
The lyrics used were from the Russian translation by Alexander N Strugovshchikov (1808-1878) of "Mephistopheles' song at Auerbach Cellar" in Part One of Johann Wolfgang von Goethe's Faust.

Other Adaptations
There are works of the Song of the Flea by other composers: Ludwig van Beethoven, Hector Berlioz, Richard Wagner and Ferruccio Busoni. Beethoven's song has orchestrations by Igor Stravinsky and Dmitri Shostakovich.

See also
 Faust by Johann Wolfgang von Goethe

References

External links
 The sheet music of Mephistopheles' Song of the Flea (with Russian, French, German and English texts) - Igor Stravinsky's orchestration

Songs about insects
Compositions by Modest Mussorgsky
Musical settings of poems by Johann Wolfgang von Goethe
Music based on Goethe's Faust
1879 songs
Grammy Hall of Fame Award recipients